Eugene E. Stone III Stadium is a soccer stadium located in Columbia, South Carolina on the campus of the University of South Carolina. The 5,000 seat ground is home to the USC Gamecocks soccer teams since 1981, when the Gamecocks started the men's program in 1978.

The current grandstand was built in 1996 thanks to a $1 million grant from Eugene E. Stone III, a Carolina graduate.

The nickname "the Graveyard" comes from the stadium's proximity to the House of Peace cemetery.

The women's team plays in the Southeastern Conference, while the men's team moves from Conference USA to the Sun Belt Conference effective with the 2022 season. Men's soccer is not sanctioned by the SEC; Carolina and the other SEC men's soccer school, Kentucky, played in C-USA from 2005 through 2021, and moved together to the Sun Belt in 2022.

External links
 Stone Stadium at USC Athletics
 Stone Stadium at Google Maps

South Carolina Gamecocks
Soccer venues in South Carolina
College soccer venues in the United States
Sports venues completed in 1981
South Carolina Gamecocks sports venues
1981 establishments in South Carolina